Clanis orhanti is a species of moth of the  family Sphingidae. It is known from Peninsular Malaysia and Sumatra.

References

Clanis
Moths described in 2001